Historic Collier Heights is an affluent middle-class and predominately African-American populated historic area in the northwest corner of Atlanta, Georgia. It is bordered to the west by Fairburn Road, the east by Hamilton E. Holmes Drive, the north by Donald L. Hollowell Parkway, and to the south by Interstate 20 bridge at Linkwood Road. 

It is one of the first communities in the nation built exclusively by African-American planners for the upcoming Atlanta African-American middle class  and has been featured in several national publications such as Ebony and Jet magazines, as well as featured in the "Homefinder" section of the Atlanta Journal-Constitution. Since 2009, the community has been listed on the United States National Register of Historic Places. The community achieved local historic designation in June 2013.

History
The neighborhood was founded in 1948, and has several famous and history making homeowners, such as Martin Luther King, Sr; noted Civil Rights Attorney, Donald Hollowell; Ralph David and Juanita Abernathy, and Christine King Farris.  Collier Heights is home to several prominent figures, such as Atlanta's current Mayor, Andre Dickens, and the location of the childhood home of former Atlanta Mayor Keisha Lance Bottoms.

Historic Collier Heights is the home of U.S. Congresswoman and presidential nominee from the Green Party, Cynthia McKinney; television actor Emmanuel Lewis from the "Webster" television series; Georgia House of Representative Member, Billy McKinney; Attorney and former State Senator, Leroy Johnson; famed celebrity Attorney, Antavius Weems; television actress Jasmine Guy from Diff'rent World; Asa G. Yancey, Sr., one of the first African American doctors in Georgia; and Herman J. Russell, Contractor and civic leader.

Neighborhood organization
Historic Collier Heights has two officially recognized community Associations that represent the citizens of the Historic District.  The inaugural Association is The Collier Heights Community Association (CHCA)–which formed in 1968.  The second, and more popular organization is The Historic Collier Heights Community Association (Historic Collier), which is the largest neighborhood organization in Historic Collier Heights, encompassing the entire community/neighborhood.  Key committees within the CHCA and the "Historic Collier" Association are the Historic Committee, which focuses on master planning for preserving the history of the community and neighborhood improvement projects.  

Both Associations enjoy popularity and organize a number of festivities throughout the year, such as the National Night Out-a summer block party, a Christmas party and the Historic Collier's "Salute To Legends" celebration, which pays homage to the famous history-making residents of Collier Heights.  Executive committee members are voted into office for one-year terms. Elections are held in December at the Association's annual Christmas party. 

The CHCA meets the 2nd Tuesday of every month at Berean Seventh-Day Adventist Church (291 Hamilton E Holmes Dr NW, Atlanta, GA) at 6:30pm.  The "Historic Collier" Association meets on the 1st Thursday of every month at St. Paul of the Cross Church (551 Harwell Rd NW, Atlanta, GA 30318) at 7:00pm.  Both organizations enjoy a social media presence, being available on Facebook, Twitter, and TikTok.  The "Historic Collier" Association has a website at https://www.historiccollier.com

Awards and recognitions
The City of Atlanta declared September 8, 2009, as Collier Heights day, presenting the community with a proclamation for its historic significance in the city and the nation.  Similarly, Fulton County, Georgia, declared September 16, 2009, as Collier Heights day in the county.

In 2008, under community Association President, Attorney Antavius Weems, Collier Heights began its quest to become the first community in the nation to be registered as a Historic Site, listed on the United States National Register of Historic Places, due to its significance of being the first community in the nation built by African Americans for their fellow African Americans. On June 23, 2009, the community achieved its goal. The community achieved local historic designation in June 2013.

During the 2021 Mayoral election cycle, it became notable that two of the top three Mayoral candidates, Felicia Moore and Andre Dickens are residents of the Historic Collier Heights area, which gives credence to the community's affluence, strong political presence and ties as one of Atlanta's strongest communities.

Education

Public 

Bazoline E. Usher Collier Heights Elementary School
Harper-Archer Elementary School 
John Lewis Invictus Academy (6th-7th Grades)
Douglass High School

Private
Berean Academy; K–12; Yvonne Brown, Principal
St. Paul of the Cross Christian Academy; K–12

Public libraries
 Atlanta–Fulton Public Library System operates the Adamsville–Collier Heights Branch.

Transportation 
Besides the main arterial road, Collier Drive, other roads include Waterford Road, Hamilton E. Holmes Rd, and borders Donald Lee Hollowell Pkwy.

MARTA serves Collier Heights with the Hamilton E. Holmes transit station, which is the system's westernmost route.

External links
Collier Heights website
Brick by Brick: Atlanta’s Collier Heights photo essay showing several homes

References

Historic districts on the National Register of Historic Places in Georgia (U.S. state)
African-American history of Georgia (U.S. state)
Neighborhoods in Atlanta
National Register of Historic Places in Atlanta